Echolocation is the use of sound as a form of navigation.

Navigation using sound
 Acoustic location, the general use of sound to locate objects.
 Animal echolocation, non-human animals emitting sound waves and listening to the echo in order to locate objects or navigate.
 Human echolocation, the use of sound by people to navigate.
 Sonar (sound navigation and ranging), the use of sound on water or underwater, to navigate or to locate other watercraft, usually by submarines.
 Echo sounding, listening to the echo of sound pulses to measure the distance to the bottom of the sea, a special case of Sonar.
 Medical ultrasonography, the use of ultrasound echoes to look inside the body.

Other
 Echolocation (album), a 2001 album by Fruit Bats
 Echolocation, a 2017 album by Gone Is Gone

See also
 Radar, locating objects by detecting the echo of emitted radio waves
 Lidar, locating objects by detecting the echo of emitted laser beams
 Time to Echolocate, a 2005 album by The Ebb and Flow